23rd Street is a side platformed Sacramento RT light rail station in the Midtown neighborhood of Sacramento, California, United States. The station was opened on September 5, 1987, and is operated by the Sacramento Regional Transit District. It is served by the Gold Line. The station is located at the intersection of 23rd and R Streets, and is in the Central City Fare Zone. It also serves a portion of the Richmond Grove neighborhood.

Platforms and tracks

References

Sacramento Regional Transit light rail stations
Railway stations in the United States opened in 1987